The 2013–14 FA Youth Cup was the 62nd edition of the FA Youth Cup.

The competition consisted of several rounds and was preceded by a qualifying competition, starting with the preliminary round which is followed by 3 qualifying rounds for non-League teams. Football League teams enter the draw thereafter, with League One and League Two teams entered at the first round Proper, and Premier League and Championship teams entered at the third round proper.
The competition was won by Chelsea who defeated Fulham 7-6 on aggregate.

Calendar

Qualifying rounds

Preliminary round

† - After extra time

First qualifying round

† - After extra time

Second qualifying round

† - After extra time

Third qualifying round

† - After extra time

First round proper

† - After extra time

Second round proper

† - After extra time

Third round proper

† - After extra time

Fourth round proper

† - After extra time

Fifth round proper

† - After extra time

Quarter-finals

Semi-finals

|}

First leg

Second leg

Final

First leg

Second leg

Chelsea won 7–6 on aggregate.

See also
 2013–14 Professional U18 Development League
 2013–14 Under-21 Premier League Cup
 2013–14 FA Cup
 2013–14 in English football

References

External links
 The FA Youth Cup at The Football Association official website

FA Youth Cup seasons
FA
Fa Youth Cup, 2013-14